The Providence Rubes were an Eastern League baseball team based in Providence, Rhode Island. Their manager was Rube Marquard, after whom the team was presumably named. They were the league champions in 1926, their only year of existence.

They were affiliated with the Boston Braves.

References

Baseball teams established in 1926
Defunct Eastern League (1938–present) teams
Professional baseball teams in Rhode Island
Boston Braves minor league affiliates
1926 establishments in Rhode Island
1926 disestablishments in Rhode Island
Baseball teams disestablished in 1926
Sports in Providence, Rhode Island
Defunct baseball teams in Rhode Island